Scorticateli vivi also known as Skin 'em Alive and  The Wild Geese Attack Again  is a 1978 Italian Macaroni combat film about a fictional group of mercenaries in Africa.  The film was co-written, produced and directed by screenwriter Mario Siciliano that was inspired by the international success of The Wild Geese.  The film features extensive reuse of action footage from Siciliano's 1969 mercenary  film Seven Red Berets. The film stars South African journalist Bryan Torquil Rostron in his final film appearance. Despite the title, none of the characters are skinned alive in the film.

Plot
Rudy, a young man from an unnamed European nation is beaten up by gangsters and threatened with death if he does not pay his debts.  Rudy uses deceit to gain enough money to join his half brother Colonel Franz Kṻbler who leads a pack of mercenaries in an unnamed African nation.  Rudy finds himself joining the mercenaries to rescue his brother and claim a share of diamonds.

References

External links

1978 films
1970s action war films
Films set in Africa
Films about mercenaries
Macaroni Combat films
Films scored by Stelvio Cipriani
1970s Italian films